The year 1994 in science and technology involved many significant events, listed below.

Archaeology and paleontology
 March 31 – The journal Nature reports the finding in Ethiopia of the first complete Australopithecus afarensis skull, significant in the study of human evolution.
 December 18 – Chauvet Cave discovered by Jean-Marie Chauvet and other speleologists near Vallon-Pont-d'Arc in the Ardèche department of southern France, containing some of the earliest known cave paintings of animals, as well as other evidence of Upper Paleolithic life.
 The Australopithecus skeleton "Little Foot" is identified in South Africa.

Astronomy and space exploration
 July 16–22 – The fragments of Comet Shoemaker–Levy 9 impact the planet Jupiter.
 July 21 – R. Ibata, M. Irwin, and G. Gilmore discover the Sagittarius Dwarf Elliptical Galaxy, a satellite galaxy of the Milky Way, considered the closest galaxy to the Milky Way until 2003.
 October 12 – NASA loses contact with the Magellan spacecraft after a successful mission. The probe crashes into Venus shortly after.
 Asteroid 7484 Dogo Onsesn is discovered by Masahiro Koishikawa.
 14032 Mego is discovered.
 8C 1435+63 is discovered and at z=4.25 becomes the most distant known galaxy.

Biology and medicine
 September 10 – Wollemia (the 'Wollemi Pine'), previously known only from fossils, is discovered living in remote rainforest gorges in the Wollemi National Park of New South Wales by David Noble.
 October – First public demonstration of the Cochrane Database of Systematic Reviews.
 December 15 – Publication of the "Fukuda" clinical description of chronic fatigue syndrome.
 The Dingiso or tree-kangaroo of Western New Guinea is first seen by scientists.
 Gilbert's potoroo is rediscovered in Australia having been thought extinct.
 Flora of China begins publication.
 The first gene linked to Alzheimer's disease is discovered. No new linked genes would be found until 2009.
 The BRCA1 gene is cloned by scientists at University of Utah, National Institute of Environmental Health Sciences (NIEHS) and Myriad Genetics.
 The Western Hemisphere is declared free of polio.

Chemistry
 November 9 – Darmstadtium first detected at the Gesellschaft für Schwerionenforschung (GSI) in Darmstadt, Germany, by Peter Armbruster and Gottfried Münzenberg, under the direction of Prof. Sigurd Hofmann.
 December 8 – The first three atoms of Roentgenium are observed by an international team led by Sigurd Hofmann at the GSI in Darmstadt.

Computer science
 January – Jerry Yang and David Filo create "Jerry's Guide to the World Wide Web", a hierarchically organised website, while studying at Stanford University; in April it is renamed Yahoo!
 April 12 – Husband-and-wife law partners Laurence Canter and Martha Siegel post the first massive commercial spam on Usenet in the United States.
 July 5 - Jeff Bezos launches Amazon
 December 3 – Sony release the PlayStation fifth generation home video game console in Japan.
 December 15 – Netscape launch the Netscape Navigator web browser, for which it creates HTTP Secure.
 Leonard Adleman describes the experimental use of DNA as a computational system to solve a seven-node instance of the Hamiltonian path problem, the first known instance of the successful use of DNA to compute an algorithm.
 Penguin Books offer Peter James' novel Host on two floppy disks as "the world's first electronic novel".

Earth sciences
 December 21 – Mexico's Popocatépetl volcano, dormant for 47 years, resumes eruption.

Mathematics
 September 19 – Wiles' proof of Fermat's Last Theorem: English mathematician Andrew Wiles devises a new approach to the final proof of Fermat's Last Theorem, sending his proof to colleagues on October 6 and submitting for publication on October 24.
 The tennis ball theorem is first published under this name by Russian mathematician Vladimir Arnold.

Molecular biology
 Green fluorescent protein is successfully expressed in C. elegans, starting its career as a fluorescent marker.

Technology
 May 6 – The Channel Tunnel, which took 15,000 workers over seven years to complete, opens between England and France. It is now possible to travel between the two countries in 35 minutes.
 August 16 – The world's first smartphone, the IBM Simon, goes on sale.
 December 3 – The first PlayStation gaming console is released in Japan.
 The first high-brightness blue LED is achieved, an invention that earns the researchers a Nobel Prize in 2014.
 QR code invented by Japanese company Denso.

Awards
Fields Prize in Mathematics: Efim Isakovich Zelmanov, Pierre-Louis Lions, Jean Bourgain and Jean-Christophe Yoccoz
 Nobel Prizes
 Physics – Bertram N. Brockhouse, Clifford G. Shull
 Chemistry – George A. Olah
 Medicine – Alfred G. Gilman, Martin Rodbell
 Turing Award – Edward Feigenbaum, Raj Reddy
 Wollaston Medal for Geology – William Jason Morgan

Deaths
 January 25 – Stephen Cole Kleene (b. 1909), American mathematician.
 April 17 – Roger Wolcott Sperry (b. 1913), American neuropsychologist, neurobiologist and winner of the Nobel Prize in Physiology or Medicine.
 May 12 – Erik Erikson (b. 1902), German American psychologist.
 July 29 – Dorothy Hodgkin (b. 1910), British biochemist and winner of the Nobel Prize in Chemistry.
 August 19 – Linus Pauling (b. 1901), American chemist.
 August 29 – Arthur Mourant (b. 1904), Jersiais hematologist.
 October 28 – Calvin Souther Fuller (b. 1902), American physical chemist at AT&T Bell Laboratories.

References

 
20th century in science
1990s in science